Article 9 of the European Convention on Human Rights provides a right to freedom of thought, conscience, and religion. This includes the freedom to change a religion or belief, and to manifest a religion or belief in worship, teaching, practice and observance, subject to certain restrictions that are "in accordance with law" and "necessary in a democratic society".

Article text

History
 was a principle of European international law, beginning in the 16th century in the wake of the Protestant reformation, that established freedom of religion for states, but not individuals.
The First Amendment to the United States Constitution was one of the first legal protections for freedom of religion without reference to any specific religion.
Article X of the French Declaration of the Rights of Man and of the Citizen, which influenced the European Convention, declares freedom of religious opinion as a universal right.

Case law 
European Court of Human Rights:
Buscarini and Others v. San Marino (requirement of religious oaths for public office not permitted)
Kokkinakis v. Greece (criminalization of proselytism, as defined in Greek law, permitted)
Leyla Şahin v. Turkey (university ban on Islamic headscarf permitted)
Pichon and Sajous v. France (no right to refuse supply of contraceptives on religious grounds)
Leela Förderkreis E.V. and Others v. Germany (regarding state information campaigns about a religious movement)
Universelles Leben e.V. v. Germany (regarding state information campaigns about a religious movement)
Lautsi v. Italy (legal requirement to display a crucifix in school classrooms permitted)
S.A.S. v. France (French ban on face coverings permitted)
Osmanoğlu and Kocabaş v. Switzerland (permitted to require children to participate in mixed swimming lessons and enforce this through fines)
High Court of England and Wales:
Connolly v DPP (no ground for appeal under Article 9 against conviction for sending indecent or grossly offensive material, namely images of aborted foetuses)

See also
European Convention on Human Rights

Literature

Murdoch J. Freedom of thought, conscience and religion. A guide to the implementation of Article 9 of the European Convention on Human Rights Strasbourg, Council of Europe, 2007
 Freedom of religion, a factsheet of ECtHR case law
 The Protections for Religious Rights: Law and Practice, a textbook on Article 9 and international law on the right to freedom of thought, conscience and religion

 
9